Brandon Nolan (born July 18, 1983) is a Canadian former professional ice hockey centre who is a member of the Ojibway group of Indigenous Peoples from the Garden River First Nations in Northern Ontario. He last played for the Carolina Hurricanes of the National Hockey League.

He is the son of Sandra Nolan and former NHL player and NHL coach Ted Nolan who received the Jack Adams award in 1997. His brother Jordan Nolan also played hockey in the NHL.

Playing career
By the end of Nolan's three-year OHL career with the Oshawa Generals, he finished with 81 goals and 103 assists, eventually becoming the top scorer during his 3 years of playing. Nolan was called up from the Albany River Rats on December 21, 2007 due to Hurricanes forward Chad LaRose being placed on injured reserve. In his first NHL game versus Tampa Bay, Nolan earned his first NHL point with an assist on an Andrew Ladd goal in the first period. On December 28, he was reassigned to the River Rats. Since that time, he was recalled multiple times from Albany to fill in roster spots on the Hurricanes as injuries were taking their toll on the team.

Nolan missed the entire 2008-09 season with a concussion, and was subsequently released from the Carolina Hurricanes.

Career statistics

Post career

Since his retirement from hockey Nolan has been involved in charity and other work:

 advisor for community and client relations with Ishkonigan Incorporated, an alternative dispute resolution firm in Akwesasne, Ontario
 hockey scout with the Rochester Americans
 Research analyst with the Assembly of First Nations

After the end of Nolan's career and being gone for two years due to a concussion, he attended Durham College and graduated with an advanced diploma in Business Administration and Marketing. Upon completing his studies, he created and ran a business alongside his father and brother, 3NOLANS First Nation Hockey School. This hockey camp was intended to inspire the lives of First Nation adolescence across Canada and to make a hockey skills camp available for the youth. Nolan is also the Vice president of the Ted Nolan Foundation, which has helped change the lives of many Aboriginal youths by sending them to leadership camps.

He and his brother Jordan both have a recurring role as hockey players called Jim in the 2022 television series Shoresy.

Awards and achievements 
 Nolan received awards, including the National Aboriginal Achievement Award for academic excellence.

References

External links

1983 births
Living people
Albany River Rats players
Bridgeport Sound Tigers players
Canadian ice hockey centres
Carolina Hurricanes players
Sportspeople from St. Catharines
Manitoba Moose players
New Jersey Devils draft picks
Ojibwe people
Oshawa Generals players
Vancouver Canucks draft picks
Ice hockey people from Ontario
First Nations sportspeople